Saint Ulphianus (or Ulpian, Vulpian, Vulpianus. died 305) was a Christian martyr in Palestine.
His feast day is 3 April.

Baring-Gould's account

Sabine Baring-Gould (1834–1924) in his Lives Of The Saints wrote under April 3,

Monks of Ramsgate account

The monks of St Augustine's Abbey, Ramsgate wrote in their Book of Saints (1921),

Butler's account

The hagiographer Alban Butler (1710–1773) wrote in his Lives of the Fathers, Martyrs, and Other Principal Saints under April 3,

See also
4th century in Lebanon

Notes

Sources

 
 

Syrian Christian saints
305 deaths